The 2011 season is the 101st season of competitive football in Paraguay.

Transfers

 List of transfers during the 2011 season registered under the Asociación Paraguaya de Fútbol.

National teams 

The home team or the team that is designated as the home team is listed in the left column; the away team is in the right column.

Senior

Friendly matches

2011 Copa América

2014 FIFA World Cup qualification

Under-20

2011 South American Youth Championship

Under-17

2011 South American Under-17 Football Championship

League tables

Primera División

Aggregate table

Relegation

Segunda División

Standings

Paraguayan clubs in international competitions

Cerro Porteño

Club Guaraní

Club Libertad

Club Nacional

Club Olimpia

References
 Paraguayan tables at Soccerway
 Paraguay national team at Soccerway
 Paraguay: Fixtures and Results

External links
 Diario ABC Color
 Asociación Paraguaya de Fútbol

 
Seasons in Paraguayan football